Atheloca subrufella, the palm bud moth or coconut moth, is a species of snout moth described by George Duryea Hulst in 1887. It is found in the US states of Georgia and Florida, and in northern Mexico, Cuba, the Virgin Islands and Brazil.

The wingspan is 14–18 mm. Adults are brownish.

The larvae feed on various species in the family Arecaceae, including Cocos, Attalea, Syagrus, Sabal and Serenoa species. They are one of the most important coconut pests. Young larvae feed on the carpels of still-tender flowers or, if the flower has already been fertilized, they penetrate the developing coconut through the lower part of the bracts. In young coconuts, the larvae feed on the mesocarp, opening a series of galleries and causing premature shedding of fruits.

References 

Moths described in 1887
Phycitinae
Moths of North America
Moths of South America